Tobacco Duty or Tobacco Products Duty, is a tax levied on tobacco products manufactured in or imported into the United Kingdom.

History 
Excise duty on tobacco products was first introduced in 1660. The current form of excise duty was introduced in 1976 to harmonise with the European Economic Community (EEC).

References 

Taxation in the United Kingdom
Smoking in the United Kingdom
Tobacco taxation